Charles A. Bastian (March 2, 1858 – November 10, 1943) was an American professional baseball infielder. He played in Major League Baseball (MLB) for the Wilmington Quicksteps, Kansas City Cowboys, Philadelphia Quakers, Chicago White Stockings, Chicago Pirates, Cincinnati Kelly's Killers, and Philadelphia Phillies.

Debuting with the Wilmington Quicksteps in 1884, Bastian played just 17 games before moving on to Union Association rival Kansas City Cowboys, where he tallied another eleven. After the demise of the UA, Bastian signed with the Philadelphia Quakers of the National League. He became the club's everyday shortstop, playing 103 games but hitting only .167 with 4 home runs and 29 RBI. He also led the league in strikeouts with 82. Despite this, in 1886, Bastian became the regular second baseman for the Quakers. His production increased a bit as he hit .217 with 2 home runs and 38 RBI, and he placed in the league's top ten in triples. However, as his offense was still subpar, Bastian lost his starting job for 1887, remaining with the team as a utility infielder that season and the next.

The Chicago White Stockings (predecessors of the Cubs) were Bastian's next stop, as they purchased him from Philadelphia. With the Cubs, Bastian's performance bottomed out. He batted a career-low .135 and played in just 46 games. Bastian jumped to the fledgling Players' League in 1890, signing with the Chicago Pirates, where he was once again an everyday shortstop. However, his lack of offensive production continued to plague him, as Bastian failed to hit .200 for a third consecutive season.

Bastian played a game each for the Cincinnati Kelly's Killers and his old Philadelphia Quakers, now the Philadelphia Phillies, in 1891 before hanging up his glove after his final appearance on August 22. In a 504-game career, Bastian hit just .189 with eleven home runs and 144 RBI.

Bastian died on January 18, 1932, in Pennsauken, New Jersey.

Sources

1860 births
1932 deaths
Baseball players from Philadelphia
Chicago White Stockings players
Wilmington Quicksteps players
Chicago Pirates players
Kansas City Cowboys (UA) players
Cincinnati Kelly's Killers players
Philadelphia Quakers players
Major League Baseball infielders
19th-century baseball players
Trenton (minor league baseball) players
Wilmington Quicksteps (minor league) players
Philadelphia Athletics (minor league) players
Binghamton Bingos players
Macon Hornets players
Philadelphia Colts players
Dallas Steers players
Dallas Navigators players
Paterson Silk Weavers players
Millville (minor league baseball) players